Grant Sheridan  Baze (June 5, 1943 – January 11, 2009) was an American bridge player. As of 1994 he lived in San Francisco, California.

Baze died in 2009.

Baze was inducted into the ACBL Hall of Fame in 2012.

Bridge accomplishments

Honors

 ACBL Hall of Fame, von Zedtwitz Award 2012

Awards

 Fishbein Trophy (1) 1975
 Herman Trophy (1) 1984

Wins

 North American Bridge Championships (7)
 Jacoby Open Swiss Teams (1) 1983 
 Keohane North American Swiss Teams (1) 1984 
 Mitchell Board-a-Match Teams (2) 1983, 1998 
 Reisinger (1) 1970 
 Spingold (2) 1975, 1997

Runners-up

 North American Bridge Championships
 Jacoby Open Swiss Teams (3) 1990, 1994, 1999 
 Mitchell Board-a-Match Teams (2) 1972, 2005 
 Reisinger (1) 1971 
 Spingold (1) 1998

References

External links
 
 

1943 births
2009 deaths
American contract bridge players
People from San Francisco